Teshel Cove (‘Zaliv Teshel’ \'za-liv 'tr-shel\) is the 1.4 km wide cove indenting for 1.6 km the west coast of Low Island in the South Shetland Islands, Antarctica.  Situated north of Malina Cove and south by west of Kazichene Cove, 8.3 km north of Cape Garry and 6.7 km south by west of Cape Wallace.

The cove is named after the settlement of Teshel in southern Bulgaria.

Location
British mapping in 2009.

Maps
 South Shetland Islands: Smith and Low Islands. Scale 1:150000 topographic map No. 13677. British Antarctic Survey, 2009.
 Antarctic Digital Database (ADD). Scale 1:250000 topographic map of Antarctica. Scientific Committee on Antarctic Research (SCAR). Since 1993, regularly upgraded and updated.

References
 Teshel Cove. SCAR Composite Gazetteer of Antarctica.
 Bulgarian Antarctic Gazetteer. Antarctic Place-names Commission. (details in Bulgarian, basic data in English)

External links
 Teshel Cove. Copernix satellite image

Coves of the South Shetland Islands
Bulgaria and the Antarctic